District 29 of the Texas Senate is a senatorial district that currently serves all of Culberson, El Paso, Hudspeth, Jeff Davis, and Presidio counties in the U.S. state of Texas.

The current Senator from District 29 is Cesar Blanco.

Top 5 biggest cities in district
District 29 has a population of 816,681 with 571,426 that is at voting age from the 2010 census.

Election history
Election history of District 30 from 1992.

Previous elections

2020

2016

2012

2010

2006

2002

2000

1996

1994

1992

District officeholders

Notes

References

29
Culberson County, Texas
El Paso County, Texas
Hudspeth County, Texas
Jeff Davis County, Texas
Presidio County, Texas